Wil is a municipality in the district of Bülach in the canton of Zürich in Switzerland.

Geography

Of this area, 54.2% is used for agricultural purposes, while 30.4% is forested. Of the rest of the land, 14.5% is settled (buildings or roads) and the remainder (0.9%) is non-productive (rivers, glaciers or mountains).

There are border crossings into Germany at near Wil town (to Bühl in Baden-Wurttemberg) and Buchenloo (to Dettighofen in Baden-Wurttemberg).

Demographics
, 7.3% of the population was made up of foreign nationals. Over the last 10 years the population has decreased at a rate of -1.6%. Most of the population speaks German  (95.5%), with Spanish being second most common ( 0.8%) and Italian being third ( 0.7%).

In the 2007 election the most popular party was the SVP which received 48.5% of the vote.  The next three most popular parties were the CSP (12.2%), the SPS (11.5%) and the FDP (11.4%).

The age distribution of the population is children and teenagers (0–19 years old) make up 28.1% of the population, while adults (20–64 years old) make up 60.2% and seniors (over 64 years old) make up 11.7%.  In Wil about 82% of the population (between age 25–64) have completed either non-mandatory upper secondary education or additional higher education (either university or a Fachhochschule).

Wil has an unemployment rate of 1.57%.  , there were 76 people employed in the primary economic sector and about 26 businesses involved in this sector.  161 people are employed in the secondary sector and there are 21 businesses in this sector.  147 people are employed in the tertiary sector, with 39 businesses in this sector.

Transport 
Hüntwangen-Wil railway station is a stop of the Zürich S-Bahn on the lines S5 and S22. It is a 33-minute ride from Zürich Hauptbahnhof.

References

External links

 Official website 

Municipalities of the canton of Zürich
Germany–Switzerland border crossings